Teofila Zofia Sobieska, née Daniłowicz (Polish: Daniłowiczówna) (1607 – 27 November 1661) was a Polish noblewoman (szlachcianka), mother of Jan III Sobieski, King of Poland.

Zofia Teofila was the daughter of Voivode of Ruthenia Jan Daniłowicz and Zofia Żółkiewska, the daughter of Hetman Stanisław Żółkiewski h. Lubicz.

Marriage and issue
She married the Voivode of Bełz and Ruthenia, Jakub Sobieski h. Janina on 16 May 1627 in Żółkiew. They had seven children:

Marek Sobieski – Rotmistrz, starost of Krasnystaw
Jan III Sobieski – King of Poland
Katarzyna Sobieska – wife of Władysław Dominik Zasławski and Michał Kazimierz Radziwiłł, mother of Karol Stanisław Radziwiłł  
Anna Rozalia Sobieska – Benedictine nonne in Lwów
Zofia Sobieska – died in childhood 
Stanisław – died in childhood 
Stanisław Michał – died in childhood

Bibliography

References

1607 births
1661 deaths
Teofila Zofia
Teofila Zofia
17th-century Polish nobility